There are 21 counties in New Jersey. These counties together contain 565 municipalities, or administrative entities composed of clearly defined territory; 253 boroughs, 52 cities, 15 towns, 241 townships, and 3 villages. In New Jersey, a county is a local level of government between the state and municipalities. County government in New Jersey includes a Board of County Commissioners, sheriff, clerk, and surrogate (responsible for uncontested and routine probate), all of which are elected officials. Counties organized under the Optional County Charter Law may also have an elected county executive. Counties traditionally perform state-mandated duties such as the maintenance of jails, parks, and certain roads. The site of a county's administration and courts is called the county seat.

History

New Jersey was governed by two groups of proprietors as two distinct provinces, East Jersey and West Jersey, between 1674 and 1702. New Jersey's first counties were created as administrative districts within each province, with East Jersey split in 1675 into Bergen, Essex, Middlesex and Monmouth counties, while West Jersey's initial counties of Burlington and Salem date to 1681. The most recent county created in New Jersey is Union County, created in 1857 and named after the union of the United States when the Civil War was imminent. New Jersey's county names derive from several sources, though most of its counties are named after place names in England and prominent leaders in the colonial and revolutionary periods. Bergen County is the most populous county—as of the 2010 Census—with 905,116 people, while Salem County is the least populous with 66,083 people.

New Jersey legislature representation

Until the 1960s, the New Jersey Senate had 21 representatives, one from each county regardless of population. In the wake of the 1964 decision by the Supreme Court of the United States in Reynolds v. Sims, establishing the one man, one vote principle that state legislative districts must be approximately equal in size, David Friedland filed suit in New Jersey Supreme Court on behalf of two union leaders, challenging a system under which each county was represented by a single member in the New Jersey Senate. The senate enacted a proposal whereby each senator's vote would be weighted based on the population of the county represented,  under which Cape May County's senator would receive one vote while the senator from Essex County would receive 19.1, in direct relation to the ratio of residents between counties. In a decision issued on December 15, 1964, the Supreme Court ruled unanimously that the weighted voting system as adopted was unconstitutional. The court ordered that interim measures be established for the 1965 legislative elections, in which weighted voting could be used as a temporary measure, and that the needed constitutional changes to restructure the New Jersey Legislature to be in compliance with "one man, one vote" requirements be in place before elections took place in 1967. The legislature's final decision was to establish 40 districts statewide, each represented by one senator and two assembly members, without relation to county boundaries.

FIPS code

The Federal Information Processing Standard (FIPS) code, used by the United States government to uniquely identify counties, is provided with each entry. FIPS codes are five-digit numbers; for New Jersey the codes start with 34 and are completed with the three-digit county code. The FIPS code for each county in the table links to census data for that county.

List of counties

See also

 List of townships in New Jersey
 County courthouses in New Jersey
 List of United States counties and county equivalents
 Metropolitan statistical areas of New Jersey—each New Jersey county is included in a metropolitan statistical area as defined by the federal Office of Management and Budget

References

External links
2010 Census: New Jersey Profile

New Jersey counties
New Jersey, List of counties in
Counties